Hungkuang University (HK) is a private university located in Shalu District, Taichung, Taiwan.

HU offers undergraduate and graduate programs in a variety of fields, including business, engineering, humanities, science, and social sciences. Some of its most popular programs include nursing, electrical engineering, and business management. 

The university also offers a number of international programs, including exchange programs with partner universities around the world.

History
HK was initially established as Hungkuang Junior College of Nursing on 7 July 1967. The college became a university in February 2003 as the Hungkuang University.

Faculties
College of Medicine and Nursing
Department of Nursing (Bachelor Program and Masters Program)
Department of Nursing (5-year junior college program)
Department of Nutrition, Master Program of Biomedical Nutrition
Department of Physical Therapy
Department of Biotechnology
 
College of Humanities and Social Sciences
Department of Applied English
Department of Cultural and Creative Industries
Department of Senior Citizen Welfare and Business
Department of Sports and Leisure
Physical Education Center
Arts Center
 
College of Human Ecology
Department of Food Science and Technology
Department of Child Care and Education
Research Center for Industrial Applied Biotechnology (RCIAB)
Department of Hair Styling and Design
Testing And Analysis Center for Food And Cosmetics
Department of Applied Cosmetology, Master Program of Cosmetic science
 
College of Management
Department of Hospitality Management
Department of Health Business Administration
Department of Computer Science and Information Management
 
College of Engineering
Department of Computer Science and Information Engineering
Department of Biomedical Engineering
Department of Safety, Health and Environmental Engineering
Institute of Occupational Safety and Hazard Prevention
Department of Environmental Engineering
 
College of General Education
Service Learning Center
Humanity Education and Development Center

Transportation
The university is accessible southeast from Shalu Station of the Taiwan Railways.
Taichung BRT blue line

See also
 List of universities in Taiwan

References

External links

 

1967 establishments in Taiwan
Educational institutions established in 1967
Universities and colleges in Taichung
Universities and colleges in Taiwan
Technical universities and colleges in Taiwan